Harry Roy Smith (born 18 May 1995) is an English professional footballer who plays as a striker for  club Barnet, on loan from Leyton Orient.

Career
Born in Chatham, Smith played youth football for Brentford, Chelsea and Gillingham, before playing non-league football for Tunbridge Wells, Sevenoaks Town, Sittingbourne and Folkestone Invicta. While at Folkestone Invicta he had trials at Aberdeen, Gillingham, and Millwall, before signing a two-year professional contract with Millwall in August 2016. He made his debut for Millwall on 8 November 2016, scoring twice in an EFL Trophy game against Luton Town.

On 12 July 2017, Smith joined League Two side Swindon Town on a season-long loan. On the opening day of the 2017–18 campaign, Smith made his Swindon debut in their 2–1 away victory against Carlisle United, replacing the injured Luke Norris in the 34th minute. On 30 September 2017, Smith scored his first goal for the club during their 2–0 home victory over Cambridge United, doubling Swindon's advantage in the 88th minute after Keshi Anderson had given the Robins the lead. On 26 December 2017, Smith's loan spell at Swindon was terminated following a lack of game time.

He was released by Millwall at the end of the 2017–18 season.

On 4 July 2018, Smith opted to join newly promoted League Two side Macclesfield Town on a one-year deal.

On 17 May 2019, it was announced that Smith would join League Two side Northampton Town on a three-year deal for an undisclosed fee on 1 July 2019. On 17 September 2019 against Stevenage Smith came on as a half time substitute with the scores at 0-0 and then scored what proved to be the winning goal, his first for the club, before later being sent off in the same game. On 21 January 2021, Smith joined Motherwell on loan until the end of the season.

On 7 July 2021, Smith signed a two-year deal with Leyton Orient after transferring for an undisclosed fee. he moved on loan to Exeter City on 1 September 2022. On 22 October, Smith confirmed that the loan had ended early as he had struggled to settle in Devon. On 7 February 2023, he joined Barnet on loan until the end of the season.

Personal life
In March 2018, Smith released a statement stating that he was seeking help for mental health and gambling addiction problems.

Career statistics

Honours
Northampton Town
EFL League Two play-offs: 2020

References

1995 births
Living people
Sportspeople from Chatham, Kent
Footballers from Kent
English footballers
Association football forwards
Brentford F.C. players
Chelsea F.C. players
Gillingham F.C. players
Tunbridge Wells F.C. players
Sevenoaks Town F.C. players
Sittingbourne F.C. players
Folkestone Invicta F.C. players
Millwall F.C. players
Swindon Town F.C. players
Macclesfield Town F.C. players
Northampton Town F.C. players
Motherwell F.C. players
Leyton Orient F.C. players
Isthmian League players
English Football League players
Scottish Professional Football League players
National League (English football) players
Exeter City F.C. players
Barnet F.C. players